Khashab (also Romanized as Khashāb and Khoshāb; also known as Khashshāb) is a village in Hoseyni Rural District, in the Central District of Shadegan County, Khuzestan Province, Iran. At the 2006 census, its population was 210, in 37 families.

References 

Populated places in Shadegan County